Scott Edwin Lewis (born September 26, 1983) is a former American starting pitcher. Lewis played college baseball at Ohio State University, and throws left-handed and is a switch hitter.

Cleveland Indians
During the  season, Lewis posted a 1.48 ERA, good enough to win the Minor League Baseball ERA title.

Lewis made his first major league appearance against the Baltimore Orioles on September 10, . He threw eight shutout innings, one shy of a complete game, allowing only three hits and no walks while striking out three batters. Lewis continued his dominance in his next start, throwing six shutout innings against the Minnesota Twins, running his scoreless innings streak to 14 to start his career. In total, Lewis started four games for the Tribe, going 4–0 with a 2.63 ERA. For his efforts, Lewis earned the American League Rookie of the Month Award for September .

Lewis was slated to be a member of the Indians' starting rotation for the 2009 season, but was placed on the 15-day disabled list on April 11 with a left elbow strain; he was later transferred to the 60-day disabled list. Lewis was activated from the DL on August 17 and optioned to Triple-A Columbus. He was then outrighted to Columbus on October 30.

Lewis began the 2010 regular season on the Columbus Clippers' roster. He was released on May 14, 2010.

References

External links

1983 births
Living people
Cleveland Indians players
Baseball players from California
Major League Baseball pitchers
Ohio State Buckeyes baseball players
Mahoning Valley Scrappers players
Kinston Indians players
Akron Aeros players
Buffalo Bisons (minor league) players
Arizona League Indians players
Lake County Captains players
Columbus Clippers players